Amara is a village in Udhampur district, Jammu & Kashmir, India.

Demographics 
According to the 2011 Census of India, Amara village has a total population of 1,745 people including 915 males and 830 females with a literacy rate of 59.71%.

References 

Villages in Udhampur district